The Bay de Verde Peninsula is the largest peninsula that makes up part of the Avalon Peninsula, of the province of Newfoundland and Labrador, Canada. The peninsula separates both Trinity and Conception Bay.

Geography
Starting from the Conception Bay side it commences at the bottom of Conception Bay at Holyrood and continues north to Bay de Verde and Split Point the boundary for Conception Bay. Continuing around the tip of the peninsula to Breakheart Point the boundary point for Trinity Bay and continue in a southerly direction to South Dildo.

The highways servicing the Bay de Verde Peninsula are Route 60, Route 70, Route 80, and many local roads.

History
This peninsula contains the oldest settlements on the island of Newfoundland.

Economy
The communities and towns on the Bay de Verde Peninsula have grown due to the fishing grounds in its proximity and its closeness to the rich fishing grounds of the Grand Banks.

Communities
Grate's Cove
Bay de Verde
Caplin Cove
Lower Island Cove
Burnt Point
Gull Island
Northern Bay
Blackhead
Salmon Cove
Victoria
Clowns Cove
Freshwater
Carbonear
Harbour Grace
Bishop's Cove
Spaniard's Bay
Chapel's Cove
Daniel's Cove
Old Perlican
Holyrood
Job's Cove
Lakeview
Low Point
Red Head Cove
Woodford
Ochre Pit Cove
Western Bay

See also
List of communities in Newfoundland and Labrador

References

Peninsulas of Newfoundland and Labrador